RECODE is a database of "programmed" frameshifts, bypassing and codon redefinition used for gene expression.

See also
 Translational frameshift

References

External links
 http://recode.ucc.ie/

Biological databases
Genetics databases
Cis-regulatory RNA elements
Gene expression